Cherokee is an unincorporated community in San Saba County in western Central Texas. According to the Handbook of Texas, the community had an estimated population of 175 in 2000.

Geography
Cherokee is located at the junction of State Highway 16 and RM 501 in southern San Saba County, about 15 miles south of San Saba and 18 miles north of Llano.

History
Named for nearby Cherokee Creek, the community was established in the early 1850s, when P.P. "Pop" Woodard settled at a site 5 miles west of the present location. A post office opened in 1858 and changed its location several times before ending up in James Samuel Hart's store in July 1879. The permanent town site was laid out by David Seth Hanna in 1878. The community had an estimated population of 500 by the mid-1890s and supported several businesses. The community population was around 250 during the 1920s and had a bank and two newspapers. With no rail connection, Cherokee remained small and the number of residents held steady at around 250 throughout most of the 20th century. That figure had fallen to 175 by 1990 and remained at that level in 2000. Farmers raised sheep, poultry, and pecans.

Today, the community has a post office (zip code: 76832), a general store, and a volunteer fire department. Ranching and hunting are the primary business activities in the area. During the fall, seasonal hunting brings in additional revenue that supports a feed store, as well as taxidermy and restaurant operations. The Cherokee Home for Children, a non-profit Christian-based basic-care residential children's facility, is located just north of the community.

On June 12, 2009, two tornadoes struck Cherokee. Several tree limbs were knocked off and a few oak trees were snapped.

Education
Cherokee became a county center of higher education when Francis Marion Behrns established the Cherokee Academy in 1894. Two years later, the name was changed to West Texas Normal and Business College. A building that originally belonged to the college was purchased from Behrns on April 4, 1911, to house Cherokee Junior College. In 1921, it was sold to the county school district to serve as a high school. Cherokee High School's main building was destroyed in a 1945 fire. It was rebuilt using the original facade.

Public education in the community of Cherokee is provided by the Cherokee Independent School District. The district has one campus, Cherokee School, that serves students in grades kindergarten through 12.

Climate
The climate in this area is characterized by hot, humid summers and generally mild to cool winters.  According to the Köppen climate classification system, Cherokee has a humid subtropical climate, Cfa on climate maps.

Notable people
 Kelcy Warren, politician, owns a ranch in Cherokee.
 Dan Kuykendall, U.S. Representative for Tennessee, was born in Cherokee.
 Ronnie Floyd, pastor of the local First Baptist Church (1976-1978).

Gallery

References

External links
Cherokee Community Site
Cherokee Independent School District

Unincorporated communities in San Saba County, Texas
Unincorporated communities in Texas